Thanggam LRT station (SW4) is an elevated Light Rail Transit (LRT) station on the Sengkang LRT line West Loop in Fernvale, Sengkang, Singapore, along Fernvale Road. It was opened on 29 January 2005 together with the Punggol LRT East Loop. This station is located near some shophouses along Jalan Kayu as well as Parc Botannia and High Park Residences condominiums. That road can be accessed via a link bridge towards Lorong Samak, a small road off Jalan Kayu, at the west exit (Exit A) of the station.

Etymology

There are two meanings for Thanggam in both Malay and Tamil. It means "to describe a tight and strong notched connection of wooden planks" in Malay. In Tamil, the word means gold. The station is named after a nearby road Lorong Tanggam, which is off Sengkang West Way.

References

External links

Railway stations in Singapore opened in 2005
Fernvale, Singapore
LRT stations in Sengkang
Light Rail Transit (Singapore) stations